The  was the senior wartime commander of the ships of the line of the navy of the Republic of Venice.

History and functions
The Venetian navy had traditionally been a galley-based force. The first organized tactical formations of sailing ships—originally merchant vessels chartered for naval service—began being formed in the late 15th century.

He served as commander-in-chief of the sailing fleet and commanded the first division of 9 ships, while the  commanded the second, etc.

As distinctive signs, his flagship carried a single lantern aft, the standard of Saint Mark on the starboard side aft, and on the mainmast a square ensign of Saint Mark.

References

Sources
 

Military ranks of the Venetian navy
Republic of Venice admirals